Eunoe macrophthalma is a scale worm described from the South Atlantic Ocean from a depth of about 2200m.

Description
The species has 15 pairs of elytra (assumed). Lateral antennae inserted ventrally (beneath prostomium and median antenna). Notochaetae about as thick as neurochaetae. Bidentate neurochaetae absent.

References

Phyllodocida